Sagada is a municipality in Mountain Province, Philippines.

Sagada may also refer to:
Sagada language, a 
Mount Sagada, a mountain in the Philippines 
Sagada, Russia, several rural localities in Russia
Sagada, Togo, a place in Togo 
Sagada orange, a variety of orange grown in the Cordillera region in the Philippines
Sagada coffee, a variety of coffee beans grown in the Cordillera region in the Philippines